David L. Wilkinson is an American politician who served as the Attorney General of Utah from 1981 to 1989.

References

Living people
Utah Attorneys General
Utah Republicans
Year of birth missing (living people)